Sixtine Malaterre (born 11 August 1987) is a French female canoeist who won several medals at senior level of the Wildwater Canoeing World Championships.

References

External links
 Sixtine Malaterre at AIFCK

1987 births
Living people
French female canoeists
Place of birth missing (living people)